Aircompany Armenia LLC is an Armenian airline that was founded on 25 November 2015 and commenced operations on 21 April 2016. Its headquarters are located in Yerevan.

History
Aircompany Armenia was founded on 25 November 2015 by Tamaz Gaishvili and Robert Oganesian after Armavia suspended all flights.

Destinations

As of October 2019, Aircompany Armenia destinations consist of the following routes:

Codeshare agreements
Aircompany Armenia has codeshare agreements with the following airlines:
 Georgian Airways

Fleet
The Aircompany Armenia fleet consists of the following aircraft (as of July 2022):

See also
 List of airlines of Armenia
 List of airports in Armenia
 List of the busiest airports in Armenia
 Transport in Armenia

References

External links

 

Airlines established in 2015
Airlines of Armenia
Armenian brands
Transport in Yerevan
Armenian companies established in 2015